Cristal Global is the world's second-largest producer of titanium dioxide and a leading producer of titanium chemicals.  It was formed when The National Titanium Dioxide Company Ltd. combined with Millennium Chemicals. The headquarters are in Jeddah, Saudi Arabia.
It is a significant shareholder in Bemax, the world’s 5th largest TiO2 feedstock producer.

Products 

 Titanium Dioxide (TiO2), using both the chloride and sulfate processes.
 Performance Chemicals
 Specialty Titanium Dioxides (Ultrafine TiO2)
 Titanium tetrachloride (TiCl4) and related products
 Ferrica™
 Gypsum
 Hydrochloric Acid
 Copperas
 Iron Chlorosulfate
 Carbon Dioxide
 Molten Sulfur
 Sulfuric Acid
 Other
 Chlorine
 Caustic Soda
 Zircon
 Ilmenite
 Rutile
 Sodium Silicate

Manufacturing Plants 
, Cristal Global has eight manufacturing plants in 6 countries and on 5 continents.
 Yanbu, Saudi Arabia
 Bunbury, Australia
 Stallingborough, United Kingdom
 Thann, France
 Paraiba, Brazil (a mine site)
 Bahia, Brazil 
 Ashtabula, OH United States
 Baltimore, MD United States

Leadership 
 the company leadership is:
 Dr. Talal Al-Shair Chairman and CEO
 Jamal Nahas President
 Abdalla Ibrahim Executive Vice President – Finance and Investments
 Thomas VanValkenburgh Executive Vice President - Commercial/Supply Chain

References

External links 
 

Companies based in Jeddah
Metal companies of Saudi Arabia